is the earthly remains of a castle structure in Shibushi, Kagoshima Prefecture, Japan. It is unknown when Shibushi castle was built. Its ruins have been protected as a National Historic Site, since 2005.  The castle was demolished by Tokugawa shogunate's one country one castle rule in 1615 and now only ruins, with some moats and earthworks remain.

The castle was listed as one of the Continued Top 100 Japanese Castles in 2017.

See also
List of Historic Sites of Japan (Kagoshima)

Literature

References

Castles in Kagoshima Prefecture
Historic Sites of Japan
Former castles in Japan
Shimazu clan
Ruined castles in Japan